The 1936 Illinois Fighting Illini football team was an American football team that represented the University of Illinois during the 1936 college football season.  In their 24th season under head coach Robert Zuppke, the Illini compiled a 4–3–1 record and finished in sixth place in the Big Ten Conference. Guard Cliff Kuhn was selected as the team's most valuable player.

Schedule

References

Illinois
Illinois Fighting Illini football seasons
Illinois Fighting Illini football